The Rally for Culture and Democracy (RCD) is a political party in Algeria. It promotes secularism (laïcité) and has its principal power base in Kabylia, a major Berber-speaking region. Some consider it to take the position of a liberal party for the Berber-speaking population in Algerian politics.

History and profile
The Rally for Culture and Democracy was founded by Saïd Sadi in 1989. He was a presidential candidate in 1995, winning 9.3 percent of the popular vote.

In 1997, the party won 19 of 390 seats. The RCD boycotted the 2002 elections. Saïd Sadi was a candidate again in the 2004 presidential election and won 1.9 percent of the vote. The party participated in the 2007 legislative elections, winning 3.36% of the vote and 19 seats.

Regional strength 
In the 2007 legislative election, support for the RCD was higher than its national average (3.36%) in the following provinces:

See also 
 Politics of Algeria
 Movement for the Autonomy of Kabylie (MAK), a Kabyle pro-autonomy movement
 Socialist Forces Front (FFS), the main socialist Berber party
 Arouch Movement, a Berber political organisation modelled on traditional village councils
 List of liberal parties

References

External links
 (in Berber, French, and Arabic)

1989 establishments in Algeria
Algerian democracy movements
Algerian nationalism
Berberism in Algeria
Berberist political parties
Liberal parties in Algeria
Nationalist parties in Algeria
Political parties established in 1989
Political parties in Algeria
Secularism in Algeria